"Paradise" is a song written by Bob McDill and Roger Murrah. It was originally recorded by the band Pirates of the Mississippi for their 1995 album Paradise, released on Giant Records.

It was later recorded by American country music artist John Anderson. His version served as the title track from the album, Paradise, and was released in December 1995 as the album's first single. The song reached No. 26 on the Billboard Hot Country Singles & Tracks chart.

Chart performance

References

1995 singles
1995 songs
John Anderson (musician) songs
Songs written by Bob McDill
Songs written by Roger Murrah
Song recordings produced by James Stroud
BNA Records singles
Giant Records (Warner) singles
Pirates of the Mississippi songs